Nicholas J. Bronni is an American lawyer and Solicitor General of Arkansas.

Biography 

Bronni received a Bachelor of Arts, summa cum laude, from George Washington University, and a Juris Doctor, magna cum laude, from the University of Michigan Law School. After law school, Bronni served as a law clerk to Judge Jay Bybee of the United States Court of Appeals for the Ninth Circuit. He then became an associate at Gibson, Dunn & Crutcher, practicing in the firm's appellate and Supreme Court practice. Bronni later served as Senior Litigation Counsel with the U.S. Securities and Exchange Commission in the Appellate Litigation Group. In April 2016, Bronni became deputy solicitor general of Arkansas, and was promoted to solicitor general in July 2018. He is an adjunct professor at the William H. Bowen School of Law.

References 

Living people
21st-century American lawyers
Arkansas lawyers
George Washington University alumni
Solicitors General of Arkansas
U.S. Securities and Exchange Commission personnel
University of Michigan Law School alumni
Year of birth missing (living people)
People associated with Gibson Dunn